The Defence Services Nursing and Paramedical Academy (MINP), located in Mingaladon, Yangon, is one of military-run institutes of higher learning in Myanmar. The university offers bachelor's, master's and ph.D degree programs in Nursing, a bachelor's degree program in Pharmacy, a bachelor's degree program in Paramedical Science.

History
DSINwas founded in 2000 by the Burmese military as the Defence Services Institute of Nursing with assistance from the Yangon Institute of Nursing and the Mandalay Institute of Nursing. In 2002, the institute added paramedical science and pharmacy degree programs, and became the Defence Services  Nursing and Paramedical Academy. In 2003, the institute assumed its present name.

References

Universities and colleges in Yangon
Medical schools in Myanmar
Military academies of Myanmar
Universities and colleges in Myanmar